Black Box is an American psychological medical drama television series which ran for one season, from April 24 to July 24, 2014, and starred Kelly Reilly and Vanessa Redgrave, on ABC. The program had a straight-to-series order with a 13-episode commitment. The series was created by Amy Holden Jones and is co-produced by Ilene Chaiken, Bryan Singer, Oliver Obst, and Anne Thomopoulos. After one season, ABC canceled Black Box on August 7, 2014.

Plot
Catherine Black is a famous neurologist who secretly has bipolar disorder. The only person who knows is her psychiatrist, Dr. Helen Hartramph, who has been with Catherine since her first break and has been a maternal figure for Catherine since her mother, who also had  bipolar disorder, committed suicide.

Cast and characters

Main cast
 Kelly Reilly as Catherine Black, a famed neurologist who secretly has bipolar disorder.
Ditch Davey as Dr. Ian Bickman, Chief of Neurosurgery
David Ajala as Will Van Renseller, chef and Catherine's boyfriend
Ali Wong as Dr. Lina Lark, Radiology
Laura Fraser as Regan Black, Josh's wife
David Chisum as Josh Black, Catherine's older brother
Siobhan Williams as Esme Black, Catherine's niece who is actually her own biological daughter
 Terry Kinney as Dr. Owen Morley, chief of staff and department chairman of The Cube and Catherine's former teacher and mentor.
 Vanessa Redgrave as Dr. Helen Hartramph, Catherine's psychiatrist.

Recurring cast
 Tasso Feldman as Leo Robinson
 David Rasche as Hunter Black 
 Rachel Brosnahan as Delilah
 Olivia Birkelund as Karina Black
 Audrey Esparza as Carlotta
 Aja Naomi King as Ali Henslee
 Edward Herrmann as Dr. Reynaud
 Sepideh Moafi as Dr. Farrah Mahmoud

Episodes

Production
Writer Michael Madden was the winner of the 1st Annual Happy Writers Working Writers Contest from filmmaker networking website Stage 32. This led to him being hired as a writer on the series, for which he also served as a medical consultant. He had previously worked as the Clinical Director of the New York Hospital-Cornell Burn Center and the Director of Trauma at the Jamaica Hospital Medical Center, before turning to writing.

On December 3, 2013, outdoor scenes were filmed on the Columbia University campus. On March 31, 2014, scenes were filmed at Wave Hill in Riverdale, New York.

Critical reception
Brian Lowry of Variety criticized the show's overly familiar premise, drawing comparison with producer Bryan Singer's earlier series House, but commended Reilly's performance and the music. Tim Goodman of The Hollywood Reporter slated the series as overly silly, criticizing the acting, writing and visual presentation. Jessica Johnson of Time Out felt the combination of psychological drama and medical procedural did not work, calling it a "a dull, preachy and redundant PSA on bipolar disorder."

Alessandra Stanley of The New York Times dubbed the series, "a well-intended mess of a show with preposterous medical emergencies and a few flickers of ingenuity."

Home media
The first season is available on iTunes.

The Complete First Season was released on DVD and Blu-Ray in Germany on December 4, 2014, by Concorde Video. The entire series is available for purchase on Amazon Instant Video in Germany.

References

External links

2010s American medical television series
2010s American workplace drama television series
2014 American television series debuts
2014 American television series endings
American Broadcasting Company original programming
English-language television shows
Television shows set in New York City
Television series by Bad Hat Harry Productions